Charles Reynolds may refer to:
Charles Reynolds (cleric) (c. 1496–1535), Irish cleric from county Leitrim opposed to Henry VIII of England
Charles Reynolds (legislator) (1839–1914), soldier and politician
Charles Reynolds (magician) (1932–2010), inventor of illusions
Charles Reynolds (sailor) (born 1943), British Olympic soling sailor
Charles A. Reynolds (1848–1936), civil engineer and politician
Charles B. Reynolds (1846–1915), member of the Washington State House of Representatives
Charles F. Reynolds III, American geriatric psychiatrist
Charles H. Reynolds (1924-1996), Justice of the Kentucky Supreme Court
Charlie Reynolds (catcher) (1865–1944), Major League Baseball catcher who played in 1889
Charlie Reynolds (pitcher) (1857–1913), Major League Baseball pitcher who played in 1882
Charley Reynolds (1842–1876), U.S. Army scout killed at the Battle of Little Bighorn

See also
 Charles B. Reynolds Round Barn, a historic building in Lyon County, Iowa